Bardon Hill is the highest Hill in Leicestershire  and on a clear day the Malvern and Shropshire Hills (approx. 50–60 miles), summits in Derbyshire (approx. 30–40 miles) and Lincoln Cathedral (almost 50 miles away) can be seen.

Near the top of the hill are two radio masts; the smaller of the two was built for the BBC as a link for Outside broadcast linking into the Sutton Coldfield Transmitter. This was then moved to the now larger mast which was originally built by an electricity supply company, it is now owned by Cellnex after Arqiva sold its UK wireless business in October 2019 and provides the NOW Leicester DAB radio service.

Potter also notes of the view from Bardon Hill that "it probably commands a greater extent of surface than any other point of view on the island" and that "An outline, described from the extremity of this view, would include nearly one-fourth of England and Wales. It may be deemed one of the most extraordinary points of view in Nature." This has attracted telecommunication companies, and large transmitters and radio masts have replaced both the Summer House and Queen Adelaide's Bower.

Bardon Hill is also a  biological Site of Special Scientific Interest (SSSI) in the civil parish of Bardon, east of Coalville in Leicestershire, England.

Bardon Hill is part of the eroded remains of a volcano. Due to its prominence, it is visible for many kilometres around. It adjoins Bardon Hill Quarry, a geological SSSI. At its summit are a trigonometrical point and a radio mast. The second highest hill in Leicestershire is the nearby Beacon Hill.

"Bardon" or "Bardon Hill" was also the name of a village south-west of the hill. Most of the village has been demolished but the toponym "Bardon Hill" remains in use as the postal address of the remaining local properties.

Ecology
The hill is a surviving fragment of the formerly extensive Charnwood Forest, and it has both woodland and heath. Mature oak dominates the lower slopes, with pine plantation higher up, and a mixture of heath, acid grassland, rock outcrops and scrub oak at the top. The hill is notable for its lichens and invertebrates, especially spiders with 133 species including the rare Tetrilus macrophthalmus.

Geology

The Hill is formed of Neoproterozoic volcanic rocks of the Bardon Hill Volcanic Complex.

The volcanic complex is described as being similar to that of the Soufrière Hills, a Stratovolcano on the British island of Montserrat in the Caribbean. The hill and surrounding land is formed of a mixture of igneous and volcanic rocks formed in the precambrian age (600 million years old); the surrounding areas are overlaid with a mixture of boulder clay and Mercia mudstone.

Quarry
The earliest mention of a granite quarry at Bardon Hill was in 1622. A small quarry is shown on a map of 1835, with large scale working starting in 1857.

Commercial exploitation was made possible by several local nonconformist families, and the opening of the Leicester and Swannington Railway. The line passed close to Bardon Hill, and a short branch line was added to allow direct exportation from the quarry to the railway network. The railway was under the influence of local Quakers, the Ellis family, for several generations, before being sold to the Midland Railway whilst under the control of MP John Ellis.

Joseph Ellis II served as Director of the Leicester and Swannington Railway, and formed a partnership with Mr. Breedon Everard of Groby to use the railway as first coal merchants, before extending to granite extraction.

Joseph Ellis II's two sons (James and Joseph III) continued the partnership with Breedon Everard following his death, and, in 1858, leased the Bardon Hill quarries from Robert Jacomb-Hood II of Bardon Hall. The lease was for twenty-one years for a rent of £145 a year.

Following the sale of Bardon Hall by Jacomb-Hood, to William Perry Herrick of Beaumanor Hall, in 1864, Everard and the Ellis' renegotiated the lease of the quarry which allowed it to be developed and mechanised. Leading this mechanisation was the introduction of Charles G Mountain of Birmingham's steam crusher, which cost £7500: it needed only 8 men to operate but produced between 60 and 80 tons of quarried stone per 10-hour day.

The owners of the quarry were paternalistic in nature: At the joint expense of the new owner William Perry Herrick, and the leaseholders, (the Ellis' and Breedon Everard), cottages and a school were built for the quarry's workmen and their families, in the village of Bardon. In 1898 a new parish church was built, and a stipend provided to pay for a clergymen. The architect of the church, school and houses was Breedon Everard's second son, John Breedon Everard, who had joined the Ellis and Everard firm in 1874. The quarry and its owners offered 'ambitious opportunities for upward social mobility' that were unusual for the time: a quarry labourers on living in one of the cottages in 1881 was a teacher; within the quarry, uneducated labourers rose to positions of high management.

Ellis & Everard, was first listed on the London Stock Exchange in 1988. In 1991 it merged with Evered plc to form Evered Bardon; the name was changed in 1993 to Bardon Group. In 1997 it merged again, this time with Camas (formerly a division of English China Clays), to form Aggregate Industries. In 1999 it entered into a series of major acquisitions in the United States. It was acquired by Holcim, a leading Swiss cement maker, in 2005.

The Bardon Hill Quarry serves as the headquarters of Aggregate Industries and is one of the 5 "Super-Quarries" it owns in the UK.

In 2009 the company applied to extend the quarry. The existing quarry covers 27 hectares and had a remaining reserve of 30 million tonnes of stone; with a current extraction rate of 3 million tonnes a year, it was expected to be exhausted by 2019. The proposal was to expand the current quarry by 66 hectares (more than trebling the size), allowing the extraction of an additional 132 million tonnes and extending the quarry's lifespan by 40 years. Following the exhaustion of the existing quarry, the company stated it would partially infill the site over a period of around 11 years, and turn it into a nature area.

Royal visit
In 1840, the then deer park was chosen as a picnic spot for a visit by Queen Adelaide, the Queen Dowager. T. R. Potter describes the Royal scene in The History of Charnwood Forest:

Her Majesty, in a dress of elegant simplicity suited to the occasion, supported by Earl Howe, and her Royal sister (the Duchess of Saxe Weimar) by Lord Curzon, ascended the steep with great apparent ease. On arriving at the summit, upwards of an hour was spent in the enjoyment of the wonderful prospect, of which her Majesty frequently expressed her admiration – Lord Howe pointing out the many remarkable near and distinct objects which the fineness of the day brought within the reach of view.

The Queen's repast was laid out on the grass on the east side of the Summer House, but her Majesty, finding the sun oppressive, wished to remove to the adjoining shade – and setting the example, took up the first dish, and was followed by the rest of the party, all bearing some portion of the viands. The place selected by the Queen for the rural banquet has since been named "Adelaide's Bower."

Bardon Park
Bardon Hill was within the area of the park, and also Bardon Hall (see below). It is said that the area was emparked prior to AD 1300. The line of the southerly boundary of the park runs a few metres north of the A 511 road.

There are still deer within the area of Bardon park, as well as foxes and badgers. There are breeding pairs of buzzard and peregrine as well as raven and barn owls.

Bardon Hall

The old hall was a moated house, in a shallow valley south of Bardon Hill. In the 1830s, a new hall was built halfway up the hillside. The current hall is a gentleman's residence with a southerly aspect and with commanding views over the parkland. The old hall was demolished, probably at about the time the new hall was built, but the moat that surrounded the old hall remains. The current hall is a Grade II Listed building and is the head office of Aggregate Industries, the owners of the Bardon Hill Quarry.

For several hundred years Bardon Hall was the home of the Hood family. In the 1830s a Mr Robert Jacomb inherited Bardon Park (which included Bardon Hill and Bardon Hall) from William Hood who was a relative of his father's first wife. Robert took the name Jacomb-Hood.

Bardon Park Chapel
In the 1690s the owner of Bardon Hill and Bardon Park, John Hood, built a Christian meeting house at the gate of the Bardon estate. This is said to be the oldest Non-conformist place of worship in Leicestershire, and indeed over a wide area of the East Midlands.

The date "1877" is carved in the stonework above the door of the meetinghouse or chapel, this being the date the building was re-modelled. The basic structure of the building is regarded as dating from the 1690s.

The building was originally known as "Bardon Meetinghouse" or "Bardon Park Meetinghouse" and the congregation worshipping there would have been referred to as "Bardon Meeting". Today, the building is called Bardon Park Chapel.

Bardon village

During the 19th century a village of quarry workers' cottages was built southwest of Bardon Hill. Bardon village had the postal address "Bardon Hill". The cottages were very close to the quarry, and were demolished in about 1988.

Parish church
The Church of England parish church of Saint Peter was built in 1899. It is beside the main A511 road, a short distance east of the Birch Tree public house. It had its own vicar, but is now part of a united benefice with Christ Church, Coalville and St. Michael and All Angels, Ravenstone.

Schools
There have been three school buildings at Bardon.

In the 19th century, before the Elementary Education Act 1870, there was a Non-conformist "British School" day-school in the schoolroom behind Bardon Park Chapel. This was in addition to the Sunday school which operated from 1820 onwards.

Later, a day-school was built in the row of quarryworkers' cottages near the quarry. This school subsequently moved to a new building nearby. The schoolhouse in the row of quarryworkers' cottages no longer exists. It was demolished along with the cottages. The second school building still stands and is used as offices and laboratory for Aggregate Industries.

See also
 Bardon Hall
 Cliffe Hill Mineral Railway
 Bardon, Leicestershire

References
Citations

Bibliography
 Potter, T. R. (1842) The History of Charnwood Forest. – The Villages of the District. London: Hamilton, Adams and Co. Reprinted by David Dover, Loughborough
 Curtis, John (1831) A Topographical History of the County of Leicester. Ashby-de-la-Zouch: W. Hextall; p. 9

Further reading
 For detailed information and history, see the book Bardon Hill by Len Noble (published in 1995). Len Noble describes his book (320 pages) as follows: "a source book being a collection of papers, anecdotes and published work concerning the ancient enclosure of Bardon Park with additional comment". .
 For information about 20th century life at Bardon Hill, see the book Marking Time – voices from Bardon published by Mantle Community Arts Limited. Editors Tracey Roberts and Jane Stubbs. Copyright 1995.

External links
 Leicester Climbs – Bardon Hill introduction
 Computer generated summit panorama Bardon Hill index
 Aggregate Industries – Bardon Hill Quarries 1858 – 1918 An Introduction Part 1
 Bardon Quarry geology
 A circular walk to Bardon Hill
 Charnwood Peaks Walk including Bardon Hill
 The Origins of Leicester – An Arthurian Association?
 360 degree photograph from the summit of Bardon Hill

Marilyns of England
Hills of Leicestershire
Sites of Special Scientific Interest in Leicestershire
Surface mines in England
Villages in Leicestershire
Highest points of English counties
North West Leicestershire District